Broken Tree Inn is a 1979 fantasy tabletop role-playing game adventure for RuneQuest published by Judges Guild. It is a RuneQuest Gateway product and so not set in Glorantha.

Plot summary
Broken Tree Inn contains three separate adventures that takes place in a dangerous border area between The Human Empire and the non-human inhabitants of the Tall Seed Forest.

Publication history
After GDW's Traveller game, the next of Judges Guild's licenses with companies other than TSR was for Chaosium's RuneQuest. These books were centered on adventures from the start. Their first publication was Rudy Kraft's Broken Tree Inn (1979), a notable supplement because it featured material cut from Chaosium's own Snake Pipe Hollow (1979) — though the Glorantha references were removed in the Judges Guild publication.

Reception
Forrest Johnson reviewed Broken Tree Inn in The Space Gamer No. 30. Johnson commented that "Broken Tree Inn will work for almost any GM, but it could be a dull adventure in the hands of a novice."

On rpg.net reviewer Lev Lafayette argues that Broken Tree Inn provides "plenty of plot opportunities," but is very inefficient in its use of space resulting in "the general lack of substance for the page count." Also of note is the prurient humour with Elven character names such as "Dry Root" and "Long Stem."

Notes

References

Judges Guild fantasy role-playing game adventures
Role-playing game supplements introduced in 1979
RuneQuest 2nd edition supplements